The Toyota GR Super Sport Concept is a two-seat concept sports car developed by Toyota under the Gazoo Racing branding.

Overview 

The GR Super Sport Concept was first presented to the public in January 2018 at the Tokyo Auto Salon, taking the form of a sports car. At the front are large air intakes, which guide air through channels behind the front wheels to the vehicle's sides. These aerodynamic features are based on the TS050 Hybrid Le Mans Prototype.

The car's 2.4-litre direct-injected twin-turbo V6 engine and the Toyota Hybrid System-Racing (THS-R) hybrid system were taken directly from the TS050. It was claimed to produce .

The car has 18-inch rims and 330/710R18 Bridgestone slick tires. A series production run of street-legal cars was planned in small numbers, with a production start date yet to be announced.

Motorsport 
In 2018, the FIA and ACO confirmed that the existing LMP1 class would be replaced by the Hypercar class from the 2021 season. With this class, the FIA World Endurance Championship would feature sports cars designed to look more like road vehicles than previous Le Mans prototypes. Toyota is among the manufacturers involved in the creation of the category.

The GR Super Sport Concept was considered by the company to be a preview of vehicles in the Hypercar class.

GR010 Hybrid 

The GR010 Hybrid is a sports racing car which influenced by the GR Super Sport Concept, unveiled on 15 January 2021. The GR010 is powered by a combination of the 3.5-litre twin-turbo V6 engine and a hybrid system that generates upwards up  with 4WD system, rather than the 2.4-litre V6 and hybrid setup that powers the previous TS050 Hybrid and the GR Super Sport Concept. To stay under the LMH regulations, the GR010 can limit how much the power the internal-combustion engine is generating depending on how much hybrid boost is being deployed at any given time.

References

External links 

 

GR Super Sport Concept
Cars introduced in 2018